Jaroměřice nad Rokytnou is a town in Třebíč District in the Vysočina Region of the Czech Republic. It has about 4,000 inhabitants. The historic town centre is well preserved and is protected by law as an urban monument zone, the village of Boňov is protected as a village monument zone.

Administrative parts
Villages of Boňov, Ohrazenice, Popovice, Příložany, Ratibořice and Vacenovice are administrative parts of Jaroměřice nad Rokytnou.

Geography
It lies in the Jevišovice Uplands. The Rokytka stream flows through the town. There are several ponds in the municipal territory.

History
According to legend, Jaroměřice was founded in 1131 by Jaromír, son of Duke Bořivoj II, and was named after him. The first written mention of Jaroměřice is in a document not older than from 1265. In 1420, the settlement was first referred to as a town.

The greatest development occurred during the rule of Count Jan Adam Questenberk in the first half of the 18th century. He had rebuilt the castle into its current form and overall improved the town. Thanks to his interest in music, the town became a cultural centre and musical tradition was born that continues to this day.

After the family of Questenberk died out in 1752, the rapidly declining estate was inherited by the Kounice family and later acquired by the Wrbna-Freudenthal family.

Demographics

Culture

Since 1999, the annual International Music Festival of Peter Dvorský has been held in Jaroměřice nad Rokytnou.

Sights
The Jaroměřice nad Rokytnou Castle is one of the main sights of the whole region. The building is one of the largest Baroque works in all of Europe. It was built in 1700–1737 by reconstruction of a Renaissance structure from the 16th century. At the same time, French gardens and an English park were established. Since 1947, it has been owned by the state and opened to the public.

The Church of Saint Margaret the Virgin is adjacent to the castle. The original church was rebuilt in the Baroque style from 1716 to 1782. Both the castle and the church were most likely designed by architect Jakob Prandtauer.

A museum dedicated to poet Otokar Březina is located in the house where he lived until his death.

Notable people
František Antonín Míča (1694–1744), conductor and composer; lived and died here
František Adam Míča (1746–1811), composer
Otokar Březina (1868–1929), poet and essayist; lived and died here

References

External links

Jaroměřice Castle

Cities and towns in the Czech Republic
Populated places in Třebíč District